Marma Veeran is a 1956 Indian Tamil-language film written by A. L. Narayanan and directed by T. R. Raghunath and was produced by actor Sriram. The film starred Sriram and Vyjayanthimala with N. T. Rama Rao, Sivaji Ganesan and Gemini Ganesan in guest appearances with Rajasulochana, V. Nagayya, P. S. Veerappa, J. P. Chandrababu, K. A. Thangavelu, M. N. Rajam and T. S. Balaiah forms an ensemble cast. V. Govindarajan of Jubilee Films was the co-producer.

Plot

Cast 
 Sriram as  Mahindra / Paramveer
 Vyjayanthimala as Rajkumari Vijaya
 Rajasulochana as  Kamini
 M. N. Rajam as  Mohini
 V. Nagayya
 T. S. Balaiah
 J. P. Chandrababu
 P. S. Veerappa
 K. A. Thangavelu
 T. K. Ramachandran
 Helen as Narthaki in Special appearance
 N. T. Rama Rao in Guest appearance
 Sivaji Ganesan in Guest appearance
 Gemini Ganesan in Guest appearance

Soundtrack 
The film's score was composed by Vedha. He was introduced as the music director in the film. He was credited as S. Vedhachalam in the film's song book. Lyrics were penned by Sundar Kannan, A. L. Narayanan, Thanjai N. Ramaiah Dass, Villiputhan, Pattukkottai Kalyanasundaram and A. Maruthakasi.

Vegu Chukka (Telugu) Songs

The film's score was composed by Vedha and M. Ranga Rao. Lyrics were penned by Samudrala Jr.

Reception 
Kanthan of Kalki appreciated the screenplay and dialogues, but said audiences expecting mysteries in the film would feel cheated.

References

External links 
 

1950s Tamil-language films
1956 films
Films directed by T. R. Raghunath
Indian black-and-white films
Films scored by Vedha (composer)
Films scored by M. Ranga Rao